Energie FC is a football club based in Seme-Kpodji, Benin. They currently play in the Benin Premier League.

In 1997 the club won the Benin Cup.

Stadium
Currently the team plays at the 3,000 capacity Stade Saint-Louis.

Honours
Benin Cup: 1997

External links
Soccerway
Footbase

Football clubs in Benin